Limb is a Foetus compilation album, released on May 15, 2009 by Ectopic Ents. Limb collects out-of-print and previously unreleased instrumental tracks from the early days of Foetus (Thirlwell's instrumental tracks would later be released under the names Steroid Maximus and Manorexia). Limb is packaged with a DVD featuring Clément Tuffreau's NYC Foetus documentary about Thirlwell's life in New York, along with several live performances of Thirlwell's ensembles and commissioned music.

Music
Many of the pieces on Limb are influenced by minimalist composers, with Thirlwell citing John Cage, Steve Reich (particularly his phasing technique) and Terry Riley in the liner notes. A 20-minute phase piece titled "You Have to Obey", comprising a looped Vincent Price sample, is included as a bonus track in audio MP3.

Artwork
In keeping with Limb's minimalist theme, the album comes packaged with a book of minimalist art in Thirlwell's "signature color palette of red, white, black and gray." The pieces are in the styles of individual artists including Joan Miró, Bridget Riley and Wassily Kandinsky and art movements like Constructivism.

Track listing

Personnel 
Heung-Heung Chin – art direction
Harley Cockburn – engineering (1, 3, 5, 6, 10, 11)
Charles Gray – engineering (1)
Fred Kevorkian – mastering
Warne Livesey – engineering (1)
Elena Park – violin (8)
Foetus (J. G. Thirlwell) – vocals, instruments, producer, recording, design

Release history

References

External links
 Limb at foetus.org
 

2009 compilation albums
Albums produced by JG Thirlwell
Foetus (band) albums